Marušić is a Serbian and a Croatian family name.

People with the name include:
Adam Marušić (born 1992), Serbian footballer
Joško Marušić (born 1952), Croatian film-maker and comic artist
Zoran Marušić (born 1993), Serbian footballer

References

Croatian surnames
Serbian surnames